Pura Manga is a village in Tiloi block of Rae Bareli district, Uttar Pradesh, India. As of 2011, its population is 294, in 52 households. It has no schools and no healthcare facilities.

The 1961 census recorded Pura Manga (here spelled "Pure Manga") as comprising 1 hamlet, with a total population of 83 people (40 male and 43 female), in 11 households and 11 physical houses. The area of the village was given as 147 acres.

The 1981 census recorded Pura Manga (again as "Pure Manga") as having a population of 113 people, in 25 households, and having an area of 59.49 hectares.

References

Villages in Raebareli district